Thiravat Hemachudha (born 1954) is a Thai neurologist, mainly recognized as an expert on rabies. He is a professor at the Faculty of Medicine, Chulalongkorn University and King Chulalongkorn Memorial Hospital, and is a member of the WHO Expert Advisory Panel on Rabies.

Thirawat graduated in medicine and completed internal medicine and neurology training at Chulalongkorn University, and did a fellowship at the Johns Hopkins School of Medicine. He returned to teach at Chulalongkorn in 1982, where he has held professorship since 1989. He has done research on rabies since 1984, and is noted for his work on rabies post-exposure prophylaxis regimens and pathophysiology. Lately, he has also publicly advocated for the banning of several chemical herbicides, as well as for the legalization of medical cannabis.

References

Thiravat Hemachudha
Thiravat Hemachudha
Thiravat Hemachudha
Thiravat Hemachudha
1954 births
Living people